Francisco "Chico" José Fernandes Fonseca (born 13 March 1968) is a retired Portuguese football defender.

References

1968 births
Living people
People from Póvoa de Varzim
Portuguese footballers
F.C. Infesta players
C.F. Os Belenenses players
S.C. Salgueiros players
F.C. Paços de Ferreira players
Leça F.C. players
Association football defenders
Primeira Liga players
C.F. Fão players
Sportspeople from Porto District